Shankarpura is a patwar circle and village in the northwest region of Phagi Tehsil in Jaipur district, Rajasthan, India. Shankarpura is also a patwar circle for nearby village, Chainpura @ Bharatpura.

In Shankarpura, there are 105 households with total population of 917 (with 51.58% males and 48.42% females), based on 2011 census. Total area of village is 8.25 km2.  There is one primary school in Shankarpura village.

References 

Villages in Jaipur district